The 16th Northwest Territories Legislative Assembly was the 24th sitting legislature in Northwest Territories history. The membership of this Assembly was decided by the 2007 Northwest Territories general election held on October 1, 2007 to elect 19 members.

Despite attempts by political parties to run candidates for the legislature, the legislature is nonpartisan and has been since 1905. The members met in October to choose the Premier, Speaker and the Cabinet.  Under the territory's consensus government system, Floyd Roland was chosen as the new Premier on October 17, 2007.

The NWT has set in place legislation that ensures elections are held every four years on the first Monday in October and the next election was held October 3, 2011.

Membership

Members elected in the general election

Membership changes

References

External links
 Legislative Assembly of the Northwest Territories